Garcia House near Mora, New Mexico was built in 1865 and was listed on the National Register of Historic Places in 1990.

It is a vernacular dwelling of type compatible for historic listing as part of a 1989 study of historic resources in western Mora County.

See also

National Register of Historic Places listings in Mora County, New Mexico

References

External links
 

Houses on the National Register of Historic Places in New Mexico
Houses completed in 1865
Houses in Mora County, New Mexico
National Register of Historic Places in Mora County, New Mexico